Dallas Township is one of 12 townships in Huntington County, Indiana, United States. As of the 2010 census, its population was 2,114 and it contained 904 housing units.

History
Dallas Township was organized in 1847. It was named for Vice President George M. Dallas.

Geography
The Wabash River flows through Dallas Township.

Cities and towns
 Andrews

Adjacent townships
 Warren Township (north)
 Clear Creek Township (northeast)
 Huntington Township (east)
 Lancaster Township (southeast)
 Polk Township (south)
 Lagro Township, Wabash County (west)

Cemeteries
The township contains two cemeteries: Maple Grove and Riverside.

Major highways
  U.S. Route 24
  Indiana State Road 16
  Indiana State Road 105

Education
Dallas Township residents may obtain a free library card from the Andrews-Dallas Township Public Library in Andrews.

References
 
 United States Census Bureau cartographic boundary files

External links
 Indiana Township Association
 United Township Association of Indiana

Townships in Huntington County, Indiana
Townships in Indiana